Robert Mihai Iacob (born 24 June 1981 in Bucharest) is a former Romanian football player.

External links
Robert Iacob's profile and career statistics

1981 births
Living people
Romanian footballers
AFC Rocar București players
FCV Farul Constanța players
FC Universitatea Cluj players
FC Bihor Oradea players
CF Liberty Oradea players
Association football defenders